Gillmeria stenoptiloides is a moth of the family Pterophoridae that is known from Japan (Honshu), north-east China, Mongolia, and Russia (where it is found in the North Ural, South Siberia, Kamchatka & Russian Far East). It was described by Ivan Nikolayevich Filipjev in 1927.

The species has dark red-brown wings.

References

Platyptiliini
Moths described in 1927
Moths of Asia